Zeki Şensan (born 1937) is a Turkish former footballer. He competed in the men's tournament at the 1960 Summer Olympics.

References

External links
 
 

1937 births
Living people
Turkish footballers
Olympic footballers of Turkey
Footballers at the 1960 Summer Olympics
Association football forwards
Footballers from İzmir
Karşıyaka S.K. footballers